Eabametoong, also known as Fort Hope or Eabamet Lake by Canada Post, is an Ojibwe First Nations band government in Kenora District, Ontario, Canada. The Eabametoong First Nation Reserve is completely surrounded by territory of the Unorganized Kenora District.

History 
Eabametoong came to be during the fur trade era when the Hudson's Bay Company set up a trading post by Eabamet lake in 1890. The canoe was used as the main source of transportation so the post had to be near water. The Fort Hope Band came into existence in 1905 when treaty number 9 was signed onto by a newly elected chief and 8 councillors representing 500 to 700 people. The new community of Eabametoong started in 1982 with the official name of Eabametoong First Nation being adopted in 1985. The main draw for the people of Eabametoong before the fur trade was the multitudes of various fish including: sturgeon, walleye, and whitefish which still inhabit the waters today.

On October 23, 2010, Chief Lewis Nate declared a state of emergency because of excessive community violence and crime, including the attempted arson of the reserve's only school. Since January 2010, there had been three confirmed homicides and approximately 50 incidents of arson in the community. As of mid-2012 there have been no further arsons. Speculation from the local police force suggested prescription drug abuse amongst the youth was fuelling the violence.

On April 7, 2016, the First Nation lost its community centre to fire which has been replaced.

The band received $649,000 in funding in 2017 from the Ontario Trillium Foundation to further develop a  farm which will enable jobs and skills training, provide fresh food for the community, and establish a local farm business. The Eabametoong Farm won a Rural Ontario Leaders Award in recognition of the growth and success of the farm, it is now expanded to 7 acres. They hope at continuing the success by adding greenhouses in the future

Etymology

The name Eabametoong has a significant meaning in the Anishinaabe language; the name means, "at the reversing of the waterplace." The water flow from Eabamet lake into the Albany River reverses each year, resulting from spring runoff water, such that water flows into Eabamet lake from the Albany River for a short period of time.

Demographics

The population of Eabametoong First Nation is 2,190, of which approximately 1,300 members live in the community of Eabametoong. The total population of people living on the reserve includes non-band members, such as teachers, nurses and members of other bands. The average household size is 4.3 with 110 households having 5 or more residents.

Source: Statistics Canada

Geography and climate

The community of Eabametoong First Nation (Fort Hope) is situated on the north shore of Eabamet Lake, which is part of the Albany River Drainage basin.

Climate
Fort Hope has a humid continental climate (Köppen Dfb) with cold winters and warm, although short summers with frequent rainfall.

Resource extraction
Eabametoong is one of the First Nations communities with traditional lands in the Ring of Fire.  Eabametoong and Neskantaga indigenous communities are calling on the province to "re-set" the process governing mining development in the Ring of Fire, saying they aren't being properly consulted.
A recent court case made it clear that mining companies and the government have the duty to consult these first nation communities before mining can commence. The decision issued July 16, 2018 by a three-judge panel of the Divisional Court of Ontario's Superior Court of Justice reinforces the obligation of governments to reach out to First Nations, Inuit and Métis when development could affect their way of life. Eabametoong Chief Elizabeth Atlookan stated: "[The decision] goes a long way in making sure that both levels of government, as well as the companies that wish to come and do exploration or any other work going forward, follow proper procedures."

Government

Chief and council
Eabametoong First Nation governed by an elected Chief and five councillors. The current Chief is Saul Atlookan. The Councillors are Josie Sugarhead, Louie Sugarhead, Fred Meeseetawageesic, Charlie Okeese and Donald Meeseetawageesic. They are elected for a two-year term by band members over that age of 18. In addition to the Governance Council, boards oversea some the Council's operations: Education, Youth Council, etc.

Tribal councils
The community and Matawa are represented by the Nishnawbe Aski Nation (NAN). NAN is a political territorial organization that represents the 49 First Nations that are part of the Treaty No. 9 area in Northern Ontario. At the provincial level, the community, tribal council and political territorial organization participate in a province-wide coordinating body, the Chiefs of Ontario. The Assembly of First Nations represents the community along with other First Nations organizations and councils, as well as over 600 First Nations across Canada.

Political representatives
The town is represented in the House of Commons of Canada by Conservative MP Eric Melillo in the Kenora electoral district, and in the Legislative Assembly of Ontario by NDP MPP Sol Mamakwa in the new electoral district of Kiiwetinoong.

Emergency services
Eabametoong is policed by the Nishnawbe-Aski Police Service, an indigenous-based police service in Northern Ontario.

Partner city

Eabametoong First Nation has a partnership with the City of Markham through a partnership accord. Through a Cultural Collaboration Agreement the communities have agreed to:

Promote social, cultural and economic collaboration in conjunction with Canada's sesquicentennial celebration in 2017
Promote harmony and goodwill for the betterment of their residents
Stimulate public awareness.

Education

John C Yesno Education Centre provides education for students from JK to Grade 9. The school was rebuilt in the late 1990s and can hold a maximum of 289 students (INAC guidelines). Secondary and Post-Secondary students attend schools in Thunder Bay, Sioux Lookout and beyond. The school is modern, well-equipped, and has two computer labs, a library with a Smart Board, a science lab, weight room, woodworking shop, and a kitchen.

Sites of interest

Miminiska is a tourist camp that is accessible by air or travel on a boat on the Albany River. Every fall, hunters from Eabametoong will fly to Miminiska to hunt for moose and set nets for sturgeon.

The original settlement of Fort Hope, now called Old Fort Hope, is located on Eabamet Lake to the west of the current town site.  There are two churches still standing, a Catholic and an Anglican. Access is by boat in the summer time and snowmobile once the lake is frozen.

Recreational facilities include an arena, community hall, Pow-wow grounds, recreational trails and swimming spots.  The school has a Gymnasium, which can be booked for evening and weekend use, sports fields and playgrounds.

Language
Most of the older population speaks or understands Ojibway. Children are taught in Ojibway and English at John C Yesno Education Centre as part of language revitalization initiatives.

Sports

Many people in Eabametoong enjoy active lifestyles. In the winter, hockey is the most popular, home to the Mens Northern Bands Hockey Tournament Champs 2014 "Bush Town Jets", Eabamet Lake Stealers, and Eabametoong Trappers, boys hockey name "Bush Town Jets Jr's" and broomball tournaments are organized at the local arena.  In 2017, John C Yesno Education Centre started the first girls hockey team in Eabametoong.  They went to their first tournament in Thunder Bay

In summer baseball is the sport of choice. In 2016, the JCY Wolves participated in two tournaments in Thunder Bay, in which they won both of them. It was the second year that the school has sent a team

Infrastructure

Local roads are maintained by the First Nation, while the airport and main streets are maintained by the Ontario Ministry of Transportation. The winter road connected to the provincial highway system in Pickle Lake.

Health and medicine

Kevin S.C. Sagutcheway Nursing Station is run by Indigenous Services Canada (Ontario Region) and provides primary health care to residents.

Eabametoong Health and Social Services provides services that promote physical and mental health for community members. They provide health education regarding diabetes, cancer, and other serious ailments They also offer programs that help with addiction, pregnancy, parenting, drug awareness, and crisis intervention.

Transportation

Eabametoong is accessible by air year-round by means of  gravel airstrip located at the Fort Hope Airport, with scheduled and chartered flights. Communities with road connections include: Thunder Bay, Sioux Lookout and Nakina. There are also flights to other fly-in communities. The airlines flying into Eabametoong are North Star, Wasaya and Zaam. Docking facilities are also available for floatplanes during the open water season.

Snowmobiles and trails are also in use between isolated communities during the winter months

Media

There are two radio stations CBC Radio and Local Radio (101.5 FM). - Wawatay is present in the community, Wawatay radio is put over the local radio waves and Wawatay newspaper is delivered bi-weekly.

Notable citizens 
 Benjamin Chee Chee (1944–1977), artist
 Ruby Slipperjack, author/educator

Further reading

References

External links
 
 Map of Eabametoong First Nation Reserve Lands (Fort Hope 64) at Statcan

First Nations governments in Ontario
Ojibwe reserves in Ontario
Communities in Kenora District
Nishnawbe Aski Nation
Algonquian ethnonyms
Hudson's Bay Company trading posts